The 2018 Texas State Bobcats football team represented Texas State University in the 2018 NCAA Division I FBS football season. The Bobcats played their home games at Bobcat Stadium in San Marcos, Texas, and competed in the West Division of the Sun Belt Conference. They were led by third-year head coach Everett Withers. They finished the season 3–9, 1–7 in Sun Belt play to finish in last place in the West Division.

On November 18, head coach Everett Withers was fired. Defensive coordinator Chris Woods served as the interim head coach in their final game of the season. Withers finished at Texas State with a three-year record of 7–28. On November 28, West Virginia offensive coordinator Jake Spavital was hired as head coach for Texas State.

Previous season
The Bobcats finished the 2017 season 2–10, 1–7 in Sun Belt play to finish in last place.

Preseason

Award watch lists

Sun Belt coaches poll
On July 19, 2018, the Sun Belt released their preseason coaches poll with the Bobcats predicted to finish in last place in the West Division.

Preseason All-Sun Belt Teams
The Bobcats had three players at four positions selected to the preseason all-Sun Belt teams.

Offense

2nd team

Aaron Brewer – OL

Defense

2nd team

Bryan London II – LB

Schedule

Game summaries

at Rutgers

Texas Southern

at South Alabama

at UTSA

Louisiana

Georgia Southern

at Louisiana–Monroe

New Mexico State

at Georgia State

Appalachian State

at Troy

Arkansas State

Coaching staff
After the 2017 season, Texas State hired Kyle Hoke as their 10th assistant coach. Defensive coordinator, Randall McCray, left San Marcos to join the coaching staff of the Arizona Cardinals, and Director of Football Operations, John Streicher, joined the staff of the Tennessee Titans. Withers promoted equipment manager, Zack Lucas, to Director of Football Operations. Oklahoma Offensive Quality Coach Chris Woods was hired to replace Randall McCray as the Defensive Coordinator by Withers. Co-Offensive Coordinator Parker Fleming left San Marcos to become the Special Teams Quality Control at Ohio State. On November 18, 2018 just after the second to last game of the 2018 season Everett Withers was released as the 19th Head Football Coach of Texas State after lack of success and improvement for the program. Defensive Coordinator Chris Woods became the interim coach for the season finale in Bobcat Stadium against Arkansas State. Coach Everett Withers was replaced by West Virginia offensive coordinator Jake Spavital.

References

Texas State
Texas State Bobcats football seasons
Texas State Bobcats football